HD 223311 is a star in the equatorial constellation of Aquarius. It has an orange hue and is visible to the naked eye as a dim star with an apparent visual magnitude of 6.08. Based on parallax measurements, the star is located at a distance of approximately 910 light years from the Sun. It is a radial velocity standard star that is drifting closer to the Sun at the rate of −20 km/s. The star is situated near the ecliptic and thus is subject to lunar occultations.

This is an aging K-type giant star with a stellar classification of K4III. Having exhausted the supply of hydrogen at its core, it has cooled and expanded off the main sequence. At present it has 41 times the girth of the Sun. It is a suspected variable star of unknown type that has been measured ranging in brightness from magnitude 5.01 down to 5.26 in the infrared I band. The star is radiating 496 times the luminosity of the Sun from its swollen photosphere at an effective temperature of 4,267 K.

References

External links
 Image HD 223311

K-type giants
Suspected variables
Aquarius (constellation)
Durchmusterung objects
223311
117420
9014